Thierry Villa (born 7 September 1964) is a French former professional footballer who played as a defender. He is currently the manager of Championnat de France amateur Group C side Agde, a position he has held since 2003.

Villa started his career with Division 2 club Béziers in 1985, and went on to score 4 goals in 20 matches during a spell lasting almost two seasons. He then joined Montpellier, but appeared only once for the club's reserve team. In 1987, Villa signed for Division d'Honneur side Agde and four years later he was part of the team that won promotion to Division 4. Between 1992 and 1996, he made 118 league appearances for Agde, scoring 29 goals in that period. Villa continued to play for Agde until 2000, when he retired from playing.

In 2003, Villa was appointed manager of his former club Agde.

In his spare time, Villa plays guitar in a rock/pop covers group that regularly performs in the Agde area.

External links

1964 births
Living people
Sportspeople from Béziers
French footballers
Association football forwards
AS Béziers Hérault (football) players
Montpellier HSC players
RCO Agde players
Ligue 2 players
French football managers
Footballers from Occitania (administrative region)